Mateusz Taciak (born 19 June 1984) is a Polish former racing cyclist, who rode professionally from 2009 to 2020, for the ,  and  squads, and rode at the 2014 UCI Road World Championships. He now works as a directeur sportif for UCI Continental team .

Major results

2004
 2nd Memorial Oleg Dyachenko
 8th Paris–Tours Espoirs
2005
 2nd Time trial, National Under-23 Road Championships
2006
 2nd Time trial, National Under-23 Road Championships
2007
 2nd Chrono Champenois
 3rd Time trial, National Road Championships
 5th Overall Tour Alsace
1st Stage 3
2008
 3rd Time trial, National Road Championships
 5th Overall Tour Alsace
2009
 1st Memoriał Andrzeja Trochanowskiego
 3rd Time trial, National Road Championships
 3rd Overall Bałtyk–Karkonosze Tour
1st Stage 1
 3rd Puchar Ministra Obrony Narodowej
 10th Overall Szlakiem Grodów Piastowskich
2010
 2nd Puchar Ministra Obrony Narodowej
 3rd Overall Tour of Małopolska
2011
 3rd Overall Tour of Qinghai Lake
1st Stage 2
 9th Duo Normand (with Łukasz Bodnar)
2012
 1st  Overall Dookoła Mazowsza
 3rd Overall Szlakiem Grodów Piastowskich
2013
 1st  Mountains classification Tour of Hainan
 3rd Time trial, National Road Championships
 3rd Overall Szlakiem Grodów Piastowskich
 9th Coupe des Carpathes
2014
 1st  Overall Szlakiem Grodów Piastowskich
 3rd Time trial, National Road Championships
2015
 2nd Overall Szlakiem Grodów Piastowskich
 2nd Overall Bałtyk–Karkonosze Tour
1st Stage 5 (ITT)
2016
 1st  Overall Bałtyk–Karkonosze Tour
1st Stage 5 (ITT)
 1st  Overall Tour of Małopolska
 3rd Time trial, National Road Championships
2018
 1st  Overall Szlakiem Walk Majora Hubala
 1st Stage 3a (TTT) Sibiu Cycling Tour
 2nd Overall Bałtyk–Karkonosze Tour
1st Stages 4 (ITT) & 5
 8th Overall Szlakiem Grodów Piastowskich
2019
 3rd Road race, National Road Championships

References

External links

1984 births
Living people
Polish male cyclists
People from Kórnik
Sportspeople from Greater Poland Voivodeship
European Games competitors for Poland
Cyclists at the 2015 European Games